The Kistler Prize (1999-2011) was awarded annually to recognize original contributions "to the understanding of the connection between human heredity and human society," and was named after its benefactor, physicist and inventor Walter Kistler. The prize was awarded by the Foundation For the Future and it included a cash award of US$100,000 and a 200-gram gold medallion.

Recipients 
The recipients have been:
2000 – Edward O. Wilson
2001 – Richard Dawkins
2002 – Luigi Luca Cavalli-Sforza
2003 – Arthur Jensen
2004 – Vincent Sarich
2005 – Thomas J. Bouchard
2006 – Doreen Kimura
2007 – Spencer Wells
2008 – Craig Venter
2009 – Svante Pääbo
2010 – Leroy Hood
2011 – Charles Murray

Walter P. Kistler Book Award
The Walter P. Kistler Book Award was established in 2003 to recognize authors of science books that "significantly increase the knowledge and understanding of the public regarding subjects that will shape the future of our species." The award includes a cash prize of US$10,000 and is formally presented in ceremonies that are open to the public.

The recipients have been:
2003 – Gregory Stock for Redesigning Humans: Our Inevitable Genetic Future
2004 – Spencer Wells for The Journey of Man: A Genetic Odyssey
2005 – Steven Pinker for The Blank Slate
2006 – William H. Calvin for A Brain for All Seasons:  Human Evolution and Abrupt Climate Change
2007 – Eric Chaisson for Epic of Evolution: Seven Ages of the Cosmos
2008 – Christopher Stringer for Homo britannicus: The Incredible Story of Human Life in Britain
2009 – David Archer (scientist) for The Long Thaw: How Humans are Changing the Next 100,000 Years of Earth's Climate
2011 – Laurence C. Smith for The World in 2050: Four Forces Shaping Civilization's Northern Future

Foundation For the Future
The mission of the Foundation For the Future is to increase and diffuse knowledge concerning the long-term future of humanity. It conducts a broad range of programs and activities to promote an understanding of the factors that may affect human life in the long term.

See also

 List of biology awards

External links
Official website

References 

Hereditarianism
Biology awards
Awards established in 1999
Science writing awards
Awards established in 2003
American awards
1999 establishments in the United States
Futures studies